Jackson Wray (born 10 November 1990) is an English rugby union player.

Born in Sunderland, Tyne & Wear, his family moved to Essex where he grew up and spent his childhood and teenage years. Wray's performances benefited from a spell on loan with Championship side Bedford Blues. Wray really burst on to the scene in the first half of the 2010/11 season, recording a man of the match performance in front of the TV cameras at Bath, before becoming a mainstay in Mark McCall's side from 2013/14 season onwards.

Wray played for King John School, Westcliff RFC., Barking RFC, Bedford Blues, Saracens RFC, England U16s and U20s. His favored position is at Number Eight and blindside Flanker.

He was named in the Premiership Rugby Team of the Year at the end of the 2016/17 season. During his time at Saracens he has won four Premiership titles in 2015, 2016, 2018 and 2019, with Wray featuring in all four finals. He also helped Saracens win the European Champions Cup in 2016, 2017 and 2019.

In July 2020, it was confirmed that Wray had signed a contract extension with Saracens until the end of the 2022–23 season.

References

External links 
 http://www.rfu.com/SquadsAndPlayers/EnglandUnder20s/JacksonWray.aspx
 https://www.telegraph.co.uk/rugby-union/2017/05/05/will-greenwoods-aviva-premiership-team-season/jackson-wray/- 5 May 2017
 https://www.standard.co.uk/sport/rugby/saracens-star-jackson-wray-ready-to-tackle-big-battles-on-the-horizon-a3652631.html – 6 October 2017
 https://www.premiershiprugby.com/club/saracens/

1990 births
Living people
Rugby union number eights
Saracens F.C. players
Bedford Blues players